Little Wenham is a small village in Suffolk, England. It is part of the civil parish of Wenham Parva – the ancient name for Little Wenham) within Babergh district. Its population is included there.

Heritage
The village is home to Wenham Castle, a castellated manor house and one of the oldest houses in England; built by John de Villabus in the 13th century using some of the first English-made bricks.

In later centuries it was the home of the Debenhams, who were notorious for violent and lawless behaviour, but who were so powerful in Suffolk that successive monarchs were forced to rely on their support rather than take steps to curb them. From the Debenhams it passed to their relations the Brewse (or Brewes) family.

The Grade I listed All Saints' Church, Little Wenham is currently redundant, but can be visited.

Notable people
In birth order:
Gilbert Debenham (1432–1500), born in Little Wenham, was a knight, politician and soldier attainted for treason by Henry VII, who spent his final years in prison. He appears often in the Paston Letters.
Peyton Ventris (1645–1691) was a judge and politician born in Little Wenham. He was knighted in 1689.
Joseph Thurston, (1704–1732), a poet much appreciated by Alexander Pope, was the son of Joseph Thurston (1672/1673–1714), a lawyer of Little Wenham, and was himself buried there.

Facilities
There are weekday bus links with Ipswich four times a day. The nearest medical, retail, primary school and other services are at Capel St. Mary, 2–3 miles (3–5 km) away.

References

External links

Villages in Suffolk
Babergh District